Duncan Henderson Ogilvie (8 October 1911 – 6 May 1967) was a Scottish footballer who played as an outside right.

Born in the Shettleston district of Glasgow and raised mostly in Clackmannanshire,  Ogilvie began his senior career with Motherwell, newly crowned champions of the Scottish Football League, in 1932. He initially had to wait until the departure of the older Johnny Murdoch to claim a regular place in the side, but quickly made an impact at Fir Park and also soon gained a Scotland cap against Austria in November 1933. In March 1936, Ogilvie moved south to join Huddersfield Town but before the end of the same year returned to Motherwell (where a John Ogilvie was also on the club's books) in a swap deal for Willie MacFadyen. Ogilvie appeared in the 1939 Scottish Cup Final, but the Steelmen lost 4–0 to Clyde.

Like many players, his career was interrupted by the Second World War and he concentrated on his engineering work during this time. Indeed, in 1941, he moved to Falkirk to be closer to his home and remained there until December 1946 (making over 130 appearances, though all but four in unofficial wartime competitions), before spending eighteen months with Hamilton Academical. A final playing season with Dundee United, which saw him playing in defence, followed before his retirement in 1950. During the 1950s, Ogilvie returned to former club Falkirk as a director.

Ogilvie died in May 1967, aged 55.

Notes

References

1911 births
1967 deaths
Scottish footballers
Scotland international footballers
Footballers from Glasgow
Association football outside forwards
English Football League players
Scottish Football League players
Scottish Junior Football Association players
Motherwell F.C. players
Huddersfield Town A.F.C. players
Falkirk F.C. players
Hamilton Academical F.C. players
Dundee United F.C. players
Place of death missing
Alva Albion Rangers F.C. players
Sportspeople from Clackmannanshire